Mrázek (feminine Mrázková) is a Czech surname. Notable people include:
 František Mrázek, controversial Czech entrepreneur
 František Mrázek (ice hockey), Czech ice hockey player
 Giedrė Lukšaitė-Mrázková, Lithuanian harpsichordist 
 Ivan Mrázek, Czech basketball player and coach
 Jana Mrázková, Czech figure skater
 Jaroslav Mrázek, Czech ice hockey player
 Jerome Mrazek, Canadian ice hockey goaltender
 Petr Mrázek, Czech ice hockey player
 Robert J. Mrazek, politician and author from New York 
 Roman Mrázek, race walker who represented Czechoslovakia and later Slovakia 
 Tomáš Mrázek, professional Czech rock climber 
 Václav Mrázek, Czech serial killer

Czech-language surnames